La Sexorcisto: Devil Music Volume One is the third studio album by American heavy metal band White Zombie, released on March 17, 1992 through Geffen Records. The album marked a major artistic and commercial turning point for the band. After the recruitment of guitarist Jay Noel Yuenger, White Zombie was able to successfully embrace the heavy metal sound they had pursued since Make Them Die Slowly (1989), while incorporating more groove-based elements into their sound as they evolved away from their roots in punk rock and noise rock. The album was the band's last to feature drummer Ivan de Prume.

The album was a critical and commercial success for White Zombie after the artistic failure of Make Them Die Slowly. La Sexorcisto became the band's first album to chart on the Billboard 200, peaking at number 26 in 1993. The singles "Thunder Kiss '65" and "Black Sunshine" received heavy rotation on rock radio and MTV, the former earning the band their first Grammy nomination for Best Metal Performance. The album has been certified two times platinum by the Recording Industry Association of America (RIAA) in the United States.

Album information
The album's sound is a mix of groove metal and heavy metal with multiple B-movie samples. Rob Zombie explained he "wanted to keep a groovable dance element in the music", a trait that he found was often absent in metal music of the era. Iggy Pop provided a spoken introduction to the single "Black Sunshine".

Contrary to rumors, a "Devil Music Volume Two" was never planned for recording or release. Almost every song on the album made an appearance on the 1994 video game Way of the Warrior.

Touring and promotion
White Zombie toured for two years to promote La Sexorcisto. The tour was a critical success and some archived footage of the shows can be seen on the Let Sleeping Corpses Lie DVD. White Zombie began a five-month U.S. tour in April 1992, supporting such bands as My Sister's Machine, Paw, Testament, Pantera, Trouble and Crowbar. In the fall of 1992, the band opened for Danzig on their How the Gods Kill tour in Europe and the United States, and wrapped up the year doing a brief U.S. tour, again supporting Pantera. White Zombie spent most of 1993 and 1994 touring non-stop in support of La Sexorcisto. They toured with Monster Magnet in February and March 1993 and with Anthrax and Quicksand that summer. White Zombie embarked on two more U.S. tours: one with Chemlab and Nudeswirl in the fall of 1993, and another with Prong and The Obsessed in early 1994. The La Sexorcisto tour concluded in May 1994 with four Japanese shows, which were supported by Pantera.

Release and reception

La Sexorcisto was both a critical and commercial success for White Zombie, climbing up the charts in the US and gaining massive MTV video airplay and mainstream rock radio airplay with "Thunder Kiss '65" and "Black Sunshine". Although released in early 1992, La Sexorcisto did not enter the Billboard 200 until 1993, after the success of "Thunder Kiss '65", which reached number 26 on the Mainstream Rock chart. It was certified Double Platinum by the RIAA, and gold by the CRIA.

Jacob N. Lunders of AllMusic praised the album with 4.5 out of 5 stars and claimed "Perhaps co-defining the future of heavy metal, White Zombie's major-label debut nearly equals fellow classics Guns N' Roses's Appetite for Destruction, The Cult's Electric, and Soundgarden's Badmotorfinger in significance". In 2017, Rolling Stone ranked La Sexorcisto as 93rd on their list of 'The 100 Greatest Metal Albums of All Time'.

Adam McCann of Metal Digest praised La Sexorcisto as both a "seminal" and a "massive 90's album", and wrote, "This was the album which saw White Zombie take their sound to the next level by inserting a rocket into their rectum. Tracks such as 'Thunder Kiss '65' and 'Black Sunshine' saw the band prominently feature on MTV and before too long, White Zombie posters began to adorn thousands of teenage bedrooms."

Accolades

Track listing

Some pressings of the CD incorrectly divide tracks 12 and 13, beginning track 13 at 3:31 of "Grindhouse (A Go-Go)".

Sample overview

Personnel
Adapted from the La Sexorcisto: Devil Music Volume One liner notes.

White Zombie
 Rob Zombie – vocals, illustrations, art direction
 Jay Yuenger – guitar
 Sean Yseult – bass, art direction, design
 Ivan de Prume – drums
Additional musicians
 Iggy Pop – spoken word (track 4)

Production and additional personnel
 Kristin Callahan – photography
 David Carpenter – assistant engineer
 Alison Dyer – photography
 Michael Golob – cover art, art direction
 Andy Wallace – production, engineering, mixing
 Howie Weinberg – mastering

Chart positions

Album

Singles

Certifications

Release history

References

External links 
 

White Zombie (band) albums
1992 albums
Albums produced by Andy Wallace (producer)
Geffen Records albums
Alternative metal albums by American artists